Kaltenbach may refer to the following:

Places:
Kaltenbach, Switzerland, a part of the municipality of Wagenhausen, Thurgau, Switzerland
Kaltenbach, Austria, a municipality in Zillertal, Tyrol, Austria
Nové Hutě (Kaltenbach), a municipality in Prachatice District, Czech Republic

Rivers:
Kaltenbach (Dürnach), a river in Baden-Württemberg, Germany, tributary of the Dürnach
Kaltenbach (White Elster), a river in Saxony, Germany, tributary of the White Elster
Kaltenbach (Wupper), a river in North Rhine-Westphalia, Germany, tributary of the Wupper
Kaltenbach (Elsava), a river of Bavaria, Germany, further downstream called Elsava
Kaltenbach (Mangfall), a river of Bavaria, Germany, tributary of the Mangfall

People:
Ernst Kaltenbach (1889–1995), Swiss footballer who played as a midfielder
Frederick Wilhelm Kaltenbach (1895–1945), American of German origin who broadcast Nazi propaganda from Germany during World War II
Johann Heinrich Kaltenbach (1807–1876), German naturalist and entomologist
Luther Kaltenbach (1843–1922), veteran of the American Civil War and a recipient of the Medal of Honor
Rudolf Kaltenbach (1842–1893), German gynaecologist